William Gerald Paris (July 25, 1925 – March 31, 1986) was an American actor and director best known for playing Jerry Helper, the dentist and next-door neighbor of Rob and Laura Petrie, on The Dick Van Dyke Show, and for directing the majority of the episodes of the sitcom Happy Days.

Early life
Paris was born in San Francisco, California. His name, as frequently reported, was indeed Paris, and not Grossman, a stepfather's surname he never adopted. Paris' mother's maiden name was Esther Mohr.

After serving in the United States Navy during World War II, he attended New York University and the Actors Studio in New York City. After graduating, Paris moved to Los Angeles, where he attended UCLA and studied acting at the Actors Lab in Hollywood.

Career
 
Paris had roles in films such as The Caine Mutiny, The Wild One, and Marty.  He also played Martin "Marty" Flaherty, one of Eliot Ness's men, in a recurring role in the first season of ABC-TV's The Untouchables, besides making guest appearances on other television series. (His character in The Untouchables series was based on similarly named real-life Untouchable Martin J. Lahart.)

After having directed some episodes of The Dick Van Dyke Show in which he also played the recurring character of next-door neighbor and dentist Jerry Helper, Paris won an Emmy Award in the 1963-64 season for Outstanding Directorial Achievement in Comedy for the series. He later devoted himself to directing both in film and television, including The Partridge Family and Here's Lucy (including the famous third season opener featuring Elizabeth Taylor and Richard Burton), but he worked most notably on Happy Days, where he directed 237 of the show's 255 episodes.  Imitating Hitchcock, he appeared uncredited in at least one episode of every season.

Paris also directed episodes of Laverne & Shirley, The Odd Couple, The Mary Tyler Moore Show, The Ted Knight Show, and Blansky's Beauties. He returned to directing feature films in 1985's Police Academy 2: Their First Assignment and 1986's Police Academy 3: Back in Training. In all, he is credited with directing episodes of 57 TV titles and as an actor in 105 titles.

Personal life
In 1954, Paris married Ruth Benjamin. They had three children. They remained married until Ruth's death in 1980.

On March 18, 1986, Paris was hospitalized at Cedars-Sinai Medical Center, where doctors discovered he had a brain tumor. He underwent two surgeries, but doctors were unable to remove the tumor. Paris remained hospitalized until his death on March 31 at the age of 60. A private memorial was held at Paris' home in Pacific Palisades on April 2.

Filmography

Actor

The Lady Gambles (1949) as Horse Player (uncredited)
Sword in the Desert (1949) as Levitan (uncredited)
Battleground (1949) as German Sergeant (uncredited)
My Foolish Heart (1949) as Usher at Football Game
Woman in Hiding (1950) as Customer at Newsstand (uncredited)
DOA (1950) as Bellhop (uncredited)
The Reformer and the Redhead (1950) as Radio Station Call Boy (uncredited)
Outrage (1950) as Frank Marini
Cyrano de Bergerac (1950) as Cadet
The Flying Missile (1950) as Crewman Andy Mason
Frenchie (1950) as Perry (uncredited)
Call Me Mister (1951) as Air Force Pilot in Skit (uncredited)
Her First Romance (1951) as Camp Counsellor (uncredited)
Bright Victory (1951) as Reynolds, the Medic (uncredited)
Submarine Command (1951) as Sgt. Gentry
Monkey Business (1952) as Scientist (uncredited)
Bonzo Goes to College (1952) as Lefty Edwards
The Glass Wall (1953) as Tom
Sabre Jet (1953) as Capt. Bert Flanagan
Flight to Tangier (1953) as Policeman in Car (uncredited)
The Wild One (1953) as Dextro (uncredited)
Drive a Crooked Road (1954) as Phil
Prisoner of War (1954) as Axel Horstrom
The Caine Mutiny (1954) as Ensign Barney Harding
About Mrs. Leslie (1954) as Mr. Harkness (uncredited)
Unchained (1955) as Joe Ravens
Marty (1955) as Tommy
Not as a Stranger (1955) as Thompson (uncredited)
The Naked Street (1955) as Latzi Franks
Crossroads in "With All My Love" (1955) as Corporal Reynolds
The View from Pompey's Head (1955) as Ian Garrick
Good Morning, Miss Dove (1955) as Maurice Levine
Hell's Horizon (1955) as Cpl. Pete Kinshaw
Crusader (CBS, 1956) as Barney
Never Say Goodbye (1956) as Joe
Whodunit (Alfred Hitchcock Presents) (1956) as Wally Benson
D-Day the Sixth of June (1956) as Raymond Boyce
I've Lived Before (1956) as Russell Smith, Copilot
Hey, Jeannie! (1956) as Joe Grady
Those Whiting Girls (1957) as Artie the Accompanist / Artie
Zero Hour! (1957) as Tony Decker
Man on the Prowl (1957) as Woody
Colt .45 in "Blood Money" (1958) as Joe Bullock
The Female Animal (1958) as Hank Galvez (not Lopez)
The Lady Takes a Flyer (1958) as Willie Ridgely
Sing, Boy, Sing (1958) as Arnold Fisher
The Naked and the Dead (1958) as Goldstein
No Name on the Bullet (1959) as Harold Miller
Steve Canyon (1959) as Maj. 'Willie' Williston
Career (1959) as Allan Burke
The Untouchables (1959-1960) as Agent Martin Flaherty 
The Alaskans in "Peril at Caribou Crossing" (1960) as Walter Collier
The Great Impostor (1961) as Defense Lieutenant
Michael Shayne (1960-1961) as Tim Rourke
77 Sunset Strip (1961) in "Big Boy Blue"  as Tom Gardiner
The Dick Van Dyke Show (1961-1966) as Jerry Helper / Jack Sullivan / TV Newsman 
The Lloyd Bridges Show (1962) in episode "Big Man, Little Bridge"
The Caretakers (1963) as Passerby Lorna Bumps on Street (uncredited)
The Eleventh Hour as Marty Kane in "What Did She Mean by Good Luck?" (1963)
The Fugitive (1963) as Jim Prestwick
Don't Raise the Bridge, Lower the River (1968) as Baseball Umpire
Never a Dull Moment (1968) as Police Photographer (uncredited)
But I Don't Want to Get Married! (1970) as Harry
Evil Roy Slade (1972) as Souvenir Salesman (uncredited)
Every Man Needs One (1972) as Marty Ranier
Leo and Loree (1980) as Tony
Police Academy 3: Back in Training (1986) as Priest in Police Line-up (uncredited) (final film role)

Director

The Silent Service, two episodes (1957)
The Joey Bishop Show (1961)
The Dick Van Dyke Show (1963–66)
The Farmer's Daughter (1963)
The Munsters (1964)
Don't Raise the Bridge, Lower the River (1968)
That Girl (1966)
Hey, Landlord (1966–67) (TV series)
Sheriff Who? (1967) (TV pilot)
Never a Dull Moment (1968)
How Sweet It Is! (1968)
Here's Lucy (1968) (TV series)
Love, American Style (1969)
Viva Max! (1969)
The Partridge Family (1970 pilot)
The Grasshopper (1970)
McCloud (1970)
The Mary Tyler Moore Show (1970)
The Odd Couple (1970–75)
Barefoot in the Park (1970 TV series)
But I Don't Want to Get Married! (1970) (TV)
The Feminist and the Fuzz  (1971) (TV)
The New Dick Van Dyke Show (1971)
Two on a Bench (1971) (TV)
What's a Nice Girl Like You...? (1971)
Star Spangled Girl (1971) (TV)
Call Her Mom (1972) (TV)
Evil Roy Slade (1972) (TV)
Wednesday Night Out (1972) (TV pilot)
Keeping Up with the Joneses (1972) (TV pilot)
The Couple Takes a Wife (1972) (TV)
Every Man Needs One (1972) (TV)
Thicker Than Water (1973) (TV series)
Break Up (1973) (TV special)
Happy Days (1974–84) (TV series)
Only with Married Men (1974) (TV)
The Fireman's Ball (1975) (TV pilot)
When Things Were Rotten (1975) (TV series)
Good Heavens (1976) (TV series)
How to Break Up a Happy Divorce (1976)
Blansky's Beauties (1977) (TV series)
The Ted Knight Show (1978) (TV series)
Make Me an Offer (1980) (TV)
Leo and Loree (1980)
Police Academy 2: Their First Assignment (1985)
Police Academy 3: Back in Training (1986)
You Again? (1986) (TV series)

References

External links
 
 

1925 births
1986 deaths
20th-century American male actors
Actors Studio alumni
American male comedians
20th-century American comedians
American male film actors
American male stage actors
American male television actors
United States Navy personnel of World War II
American television directors
Deaths from brain cancer in the United States
Deaths from cancer in California
Film directors from California
Male actors from San Francisco
New York University alumni
Primetime Emmy Award winners
University of California, Los Angeles alumni
United States Navy officers